Blomgren is a Swedish surname. Notable people with the surname include:

Bengt Blomgren (1923–2013), Swedish actor, film director and screenwriter
Daniel Blomgren (born 1982), Swedish footballer
Eric Blomgren (1893–1971), Swedish speed skater
Gustaf Blomgren (1887–1956), Swedish diver
Lance Blomgren (born 1970), Canadian writer

Swedish-language surnames